Zhejiang Geely Ming Industrial Co., Ltd., common known as Geely Ming, or GM Motor, is a Chinese motorcycle manufacturer founded in 1995 with registered office in Zhejiang province. It is a subsidiary of Geely.

The vehicles are sold under two brands: Jiming and Geely Motorcycle.

History
The production of the first Geely motorcycle dates back to 1994 when a new plant was inaugurated in Taizhou, China with a capacity of 50,000 vehicles per year.

On 8 April 1995 this business unit was spun off and the Geely Group Zhejiang Motorcycle Company was founded by Li Shufu, a subsidiary of Geely Holding Group specializing in the production of motorcycles, which in the nineties operated in the local market with the Jiming brand to avoid confusion with the Geely branded appliances.

Production was initially based on low cost mopeds, scooters and light motorcycles in the 50–250 cm³ range. Later, light motorcars and quadricycles are also introduced.

Between 1997 and 1998, exports to Southeast Asian countries and South America of the Geely rebranded motorcycles began.

In 2002, following the strong expansion of the parent company, Geely Ming expands its product range and its plant to reach a capacity of 300,000 vehicles per year and concentrating all production, painting and assembly operations. In addition, studies are launched for the production of electric scooters.

In 2013 it was officially renamed Geely Ming Industrial Company (abbreviated to GM Motor) and the Jiming brand is used to market motorcycles in the larger range of 250–400 cm³ while the Geely brand is also used in China on motorcycles and small-volume scooters.

In 2018 it launched on the market a trike, a three-wheeled vehicle with scooter mechanics called Geely Jasscol (JM175ZD on the Chinese market) with a 175 cm³ engine also exported to the United States and Mexico.

In 2022, the Jiming JM500, was  introduced as the first motorcycles of the brand powered by the 500 cm³ twin-cylinder Gaokin engines.

List of Geely motorcycles

Scooters
JL50QT — 49.5 cc 4-stroke air-cooled single
JL70 — 71.8 cc 4-stroke air-cooled single
JL100-5 and -6 — 98.2 cc 2-stroke air-cooled single, step-through
JL100T — 98.2 cc 2-stroke air-cooled single
JL110
JL125T — 124 cc 4-stroke air-cooled single
JL150T
JL250T — 244.2 cc 4-stroke single

Motorcycles
JL100 — 98.2 cc 2-stroke air-cooled single
JL125 — 124 cc 4-stroke air-cooled single
JL150 — 4-stroke air-cooled single
JL250 — 250 cc air-cooled 4-stroke parallel twin
JM500-1
JM500-7
JM500-8
JM500-9
JM175ZD

See also
Qianjiang Motorcycle, another chinese motorcycle manufacturer subsidiary of Geely Group.

References

External links

Motorcycle manufacturers of China
Vehicle manufacturing companies established in 1995
Companies based in Zhejiang
Chinese brands
Geely divisions and subsidiaries
Chinese companies established in 1995